Nick & Norah's Infinite Playlist: Original Motion Picture Soundtrack is the soundtrack to the 2008 film of the same name, released on September 23, 2008, by Atlantic Records. The album features 15 tracks, including songs from The Dead 60s, Band of Horses, The Submarines, We Are Scientists, Chris Bell, Bishop Allen, Takka Takka, and Vampire Weekend. Directed by Peter Sollett with a screenplay written by Lorene Scafaria, based on the eponymous novel written by Rachel Cohn and David Levithan, the film stars Michael Cera and Kat Dennings. The music for the film was selected by Sollett, along with editor Myron Kerstein and music supervisor Linda Cohen. The album received generally positive critical reception.

Background
Cohn and Levithan's novel had several musical references, including songs by the Cure and Green Day, as did Scafaria's screenplay. She originally submitted with a CD mix featuring her ideas for the film's soundtrack, that included songs by The Black Keys, Bloc Party, and Frou Frou. However, in the final cut of the film, most of the music was chosen by Sollett, along with Kerstein and Cohen. Sollett said that he "got lucky" with the songs that he was able to choose because, within the financiers and the studio, "there was nobody in that group who knew all that much about music or the music that we had in the film". His objective when selecting the music was to find "the best music you haven't heard yet", primarily from bands based in New York City, which was "additive to the film and each individual scene". While filming in New York, he emailed songs "right out of my iTunes [library]" which he thought would suit particular scenes to Kerstein, who was in Los Angeles assembling the film as it was shot.

Track listing

Reception 
Andrew Leahey of AllMusic says that the soundtrack "serves as a nice sampler of emerging music in 2008" along with the soundtrack of American Teen. Jim Farber of Daily News also reviewed the album positively. Writing for Blogcritics, Jen Johans reviewed that, the album "provides a terrific capper to a stellar album of mostly obscure artists. And no doubt that’s part of the reason they’re so damn cool and warrant including in a film about knowledgeable and hip music fans that you probably wouldn’t see caught dead listening to adult contemporary radio or Hannah Montana."

Spence D. of IGN rated 8.4 (out of 10) to the album and admitted that it does an excellent job on "creating a compact and linear expanse of emotions, building upon the time honored musical core of guitar and voice and the equally lasting nuances of melancholy, longing, and love. While focused a little too heavily on the years between 2007 and 2008, there are still some eye-opening surprises (Chris Bell being the prime example) that have managed to sneak their way into the mix. This all makes for a rather enjoyable listen that hopefully will be the jumping off point into new musical terrain for many and a familiar comfort to others." Drake Lelane of MTV News commented: "the best soundtracks always take on the character of the movie they accompany, and vice versa, and that's certainly the case with Nick and Norah's Infinite Playlist."

Contrarily, the music also received negative reviews. In their review roundup for the best of music in 2008, The Playlist called it as "totally disposable". Paul Thompson of Pitchfork gave 5.2/10 to the album and wrote "One has to wonder what exactly the point of a soundtrack like this is in 2008, where folks could just as easily download the songs – even the ones, gasp, that didn't make it to the disc – for the jumpoffs of their own infinite playlists. For this product to have relevance commercially or otherwise, the songs on it have to matter, and with the exception of a great Vampire Weekend tune and some frequently great (just-so-happens-to-be-indie-)pop, it doesn't matter enough not to just burn yourself." Phoebe Reilly of Spin wrote "But shouldn't a film that references a playlist in its title at least register on the Good Use Of Song to Important Adolescent Moment ratio? Somehow, it doesn't."

Charts

Personnel 
Credits adapted from CD liner notes.

 Craig Rosen – A&R administration
 Jessica Fuller – soundtrack co-ordinator
 Thanh Nguyen – soundtrack co-ordinator
 Andrew Miano – executive producer
 Kerry Kohansky – executive producer
 Kevin Weaver – executive soundtrack producer
 Lia Vollack – executive soundtrack producer
 Peter Sollett – album production, liner notes
 Megan Joyce – business and legal affairs
 Justin Smith – mastering
 Linda Cohen – music supervision, album production
 Myron Kerstein – album production
 James Lopez – marketing director
 Katie Robinson – marketing director
 Paul Kremen – music marketing consultant

References 

2008 soundtrack albums
Atlantic Records soundtracks
2000s film soundtrack albums